Shahjahan Chowdhury may refer to:

 Shahjahan Chowdhury, Bangladeshi politician from Cox's Bazar
 Shajahan Chowdhury (Chittagong politician), Bangladeshi politician from Chittagong
 Shahjahan Chowdhury (film director), Bangladeshi filmmaker